The surname Henning was originally found in East Prussia. It is derived from "Henneke", which is a diminutive of Johannes. The Low German suffix -ing means "son of". The name is indigenous to the North German areas Mecklenburg, Hannover, Hamburg, Holstein and Pommern; especially the towns Stralsund and Greifswald, in Mecklenburg, near the Baltic Sea is well known as places where the name originated. Both towns formed part of Denmark up until the Thirty Years' War (1618–1648).

Etymology
Between the years 1300 and 1500 the name HENNING was used as a popular nickname for “the Son of John (Johannes)”. In the old Baltic dialect a rooster was called a “Hen” (hen = male, henne = female). The Baltic (or North German) “ing” was added to indicate that it was a name deduced from the name of a father or ancestor.

Origins
The name originated amongst noblemen and knights, such as:

 Henning = Johannes Older, who lived during 1290 in the vicinity of Stralsund;
 Henning = Johannes Brunswick, who lived during 1305 at Kolberg. Today Kolberg is in Poland, but during 1305 it formed part of the country which is known today as Germany.
 Henning = Johannes Dotenberg (Knight) who lived during 1326 in the vicinity of Greiffswald. It is thought that he could be a descendant of Johannes Older.
 Earl Henning of Irkesleve who lived during 1330 in Haldslohe.

Distribution
During the 13th and 14th centuries the descendants of these first Hennings spread over the areas today known as Germany, Denmark and Norway. Unfortunately all records from this time were destroyed.

During the 17th and 18th centuries several Hennings moved elsewhere—also to the New World. Today, one of the biggest Henning clans is found in South Africa. However, Henning families exist in almost every country in the Western world.

Descendants
A few Henning descendants, however, remained in the vicinity of Stralsund and Greifswald. It is known that Jacob Henning (the Old) was born during 1635 at Demmin (near Greifswald). Jacob Henning and his descendants became known as the Henning Family of Karnin. Karnin is approximately 25 km from Stralsund. Jacob Henning and his descendants were wealthy and important property owners, who lived in a castle. Their castle was confiscated in 1945, during the Second World War, by the communist government who took over Eastern Germany. Consequently the family spread across Western Germany.

Notes

Books
 Die Henning Familiekroniek,

External links
 Henning Families World Wide

Surnames